Untomia formularis is a moth of the family Gelechiidae. It was described by Edward Meyrick in 1929. It is found in Colombia and Amazonas, Brazil.

References

Moths described in 1929
Untomia
Taxa named by Edward Meyrick